Tahanie A. Aboushi is a Palestinian-American civil rights lawyer and partner at The Aboushi Law Firm in New York City with two of her siblings. She was a Democratic candidate for Manhattan District Attorney in the June 2021 Democratic primary election, finishing third in the primary. Aboushi's platform included plans to decline to prosecute charges stemming from poverty, mental illness, substance use or sex work, to hold law enforcement accountable, protect immigrants, invest in community-based programs, and center survivors and victims.

Early life 
Aboushi was born and raised in Brooklyn, New York after her parents immigrated from Palestine to the United States. 
When she was 14 years old, her father was sentenced to 22 years in prison.  Her mother became a  single parent of ten children. Aboushi acknowledged her family's story as one of her motivations to run for District Attorney.  

She is also the sister of Los Angeles Chargers offensive guard Oday Aboushi.

Education 
Aboushi received her Bachelor in Science degree in Legal Studies from St. Johns University and received her Juris Doctor degree in 2009 from Syracuse University College of Law.

Career 
In 2010 Aboushi founded The Aboushi Law Firm where she handled notable civil rights cases. 

Aboushi's experience as an attorney, a child of immigrants, and being Muslim led her to JFK Airport in Queens immediately following the announcement of President Donald Trump’s 2017 Executive Order 13769, one of the Trump travel bans, where she offered legal help to people who were affected by the order. New York State Senator Jesse Hamilton awarded Aboushi the Shirley Chisholm Women of Excellence Award for her extraordinary contributions to the community in this work.

Aboushi sued the New York City Police Department for violations of religious rights after  police officers had forced women who were being criminally arraigned to remove their hijabs for mugshots while in police custody, in one case in the presence of inmates and other officers. Aboushi represented three women involved in separate cases claiming their religious rights were violated, and in 2018 the women received $60,000 each in the settlement with New York City.

Aboushi represented a 21-year-old woman who was hospitalized after being shoved to the ground by a New York City police officer during a May 2020 Black Lives Matter protest in Brooklyn. Video of the incident was captured by a Newsweek reporter and quickly became viral. After he shoved the woman, the officer was suspended without pay and charged by the Brooklyn DA with misdemeanor assault and other offenses. If convicted, he faces up to one year in jail. Six months later, Aboushi filed a federal civil rights lawsuit against the city, the officer, the officer's supervisor who witnessed the incident, and the New York City Police Department.

Manhattan District Attorney race 
While Aboushi had significant victories throughout her career as a civil rights attorney, she wanted the opportunity to effect system-wide change through public office. Aboushi announced her campaign for New York County District Attorney in January 2020. 

She ran on a platform to move the focus away from securing convictions and instead address the root causes of crime and invest in community groups to ensure that people have access to housing, health care, income, food, transportation, and utilities. Aboushi also proposed to end cash bail and decriminalize poverty, mental health issues, substance abuse, and sex work. 

Aboushi's race was endorsed by former gubernatorial candidate Cynthia Nixon, several New York City politicians have endorsed her, including State Assemblymember Yuh-Line Niou, New York City Public Advocate Jumaane Williams, and City Councilmember Justin Brannan. Progressive organizations like the Working Families Party, Citizen Action, Real Justice PAC, and the Jewish Vote and unions such as DC 37 and Unite Here! Local 100 also endorsed her run. 

If elected, Aboushi would have been the first woman, Muslim, and Palestinian American candidate to hold the office.

References

External links 
 

Living people
1985 births
American people of Palestinian descent
New York (state) Democrats
American Muslims
American civil rights activists
Women civil rights activists
Politicians from Brooklyn
Candidates in the 2021 United States elections
21st-century American lawyers
Syracuse University College of Law alumni
St. John's University School of Law alumni